Nimishillen may refer to:

Nimishillen Creek
Nimishillen Township, Stark County, Ohio